Sand Point Lake Water Aerodrome  is located on Sand Point Lake, Ontario, Canada.

The airport is classified as an airport of entry by Nav Canada and is staffed by the Canada Border Services Agency (CBSA). CBSA officers at this airport can handle general aviation aircraft only, with no more than 15 passengers.

References

Registered aerodromes in Rainy River District
Seaplane bases in Ontario
Binational airports